"Bad" is a song by American recording artist Michael Jackson. It was released by Epic Records on September 7, 1987, as the second single from his seventh studio album Bad. The song was written and composed by Jackson, and produced by Quincy Jones and Jackson. Jackson stated that the song was influenced by a real-life story he had read about, of a young man who tried to escape poverty by attending private school but ended up being killed when he returned home.

"Bad" received positive reviews, with some critics noting that "Bad" helped give Jackson an edgier image. It reached number one on the Billboard Hot 100, and remained there for two weeks, becoming the album's second number-one single, and Jackson's eighth number one entry on the chart. It also charted on the Hot R&B Singles, Hot Dance Club Play and Rhythmic chart at number one. "Bad" is certified Platinum by the Recording Industry Association of America (RIAA). Internationally, the song was also commercially successful, charting at the top of the charts in Ireland, Norway, Spain and the Netherlands as well as charting in the top ten in Australia, Austria, Canada, France, West Germany, New Zealand, Switzerland, Sweden and the United Kingdom.

The short film for "Bad" premiered in a TV special, Michael Jackson: The Magic Returns, on CBS during prime time on August 31, 1987. It was directed by Martin Scorsese and co-starred Wesley Snipes in one of his first appearances. The video, inspired in part by the film West Side Story, shows Jackson and a group of gangsters portraying a street gang dancing in a subway station, set at the Hoyt–Schermerhorn Streets station. It has been praised by critics as one of the most iconic and greatest videos of all time; Jackson's outfit has been recognized as an influence on fashion.

Background and inspiration

Michael Jackson wrote and recorded "Bad" in 1986. It was co-produced by Jackson and Quincy Jones, and included as the title track on Jackson's seventh studio album, released in 1987. Jackson planned to duet on "Bad" with musician Prince, but Prince declined the invitation; in a later interview, Prince said: "The first line of that song is 'your butt is mine'. Then I said 'Who's going to sing that to who?' ... because you sure aren't singing that to me, and I sure ain't singing it to you." Prince instead submitted his song "Wouldn't You Love To Love Me", but Jackson rejected it, so it was instead given to Taja Sevelle.

In Jackson's 1988 autobiography Moonwalk, Jackson wrote:

In a 1988 interview with Ebony and Jet magazines, Jackson said he was inspired by a true story that he had read about in either Time or Newsweek. Jackson stated that the story was about a student who went to school in upstate New York, who was "from the ghetto", had tried to make something of his life and planned to leave all of his friends behind when he returned from Thanksgiving break. He added that the student's friends' jealousy resulted in them killing the student; Jackson stated that the student's death was not included in the music video. Various Jackson biographers have concluded that the story he was referring was that of Edmund Perry. However, Perry was not killed by kids in his neighborhood; he was killed by a plainclothes police officer when Perry and his brother allegedly attacked and badly beat the officer in a mugging attempt.

Composition
The song is written in the key of A minor with a time signature in common time. The pitch is raised almost a quarter of a whole tone from standard pitch, A440 Hz, up to circa A454 Hz. Jackson's vocal range spans from G3 to A5. The track has a tempo of 114 beats per minute. The main bassline is based in the pentatonic blues scale.

"Bad" was viewed as a revived "Hit the Road Jack" progression. Davitt Sigerson wrote in Rolling Stone magazine, "When Jackson declares that 'the whole world has to answer right now,' he is not boasting but making a statement of fact regarding his extraordinary stardom. If anything, he is scorning the self-coronation of lesser funk royals and inviting his fickle public to spurn him if it dare." Sigerson compared the track to material by James Brown, whose "It's a Man's Man's Man's World" is openly referenced by the four chromatic note brass introduction to the song. Lyrically, "Bad" pertains to proving to people that you are tough by boasting, with Jackson asking "who's bad?"

Chart performance
"Bad" charted within the top ten, at number eight, on the Billboard Hot 100 on October 10, 1987 and peaked at number one on October 24, 1987. "Bad" stayed at the top position for two consecutive weeks. "Bad" was Jackson's Bad album's second number one single on the Billboard Hot 100, and Jackson's eighth number one entry on the chart. The track also charted on the Billboard Hot R&B Singles and Billboard Hot Dance Club Play at number one. "Bad" was commercially successful internationally, generally charting within the top ten, and reaching the top position on some charts. "Bad" debuted at number five on the United Kingdom charts on September 26, 1987. The following week, the song charted at its peak position of number three, where it remained for two weeks. "Bad" remained within the chart's top ten positions for four weeks, and charted within the top 100 for a total of eleven weeks in 1987. "Bad" peaked at number five on Canadian music charts on November 7, 1987. "Bad" peaked at number four in Sweden on October 14, 1987. The song spent four weeks within the chart's top ten. On October 3, "Bad" debuted at number nine in France, and after six weeks of charting within the top ten, the song peaked at number four on November 14. "Bad" debuted on New Zealand music charts at number four on October 18, and the following week moved to its peak position of number two. The song then stayed within the top ten for the next five weeks. The track charted within the top fifty positions for fifteen weeks in 1987 and 1988.

The song also charted at number two in Norway in the thirty-ninth week of 1987, and charted within the top ten positions for eight weeks in 1987. The song was also very successful on the Australian music charts, peaking at number four. "Bad" debuted on Austrian charts at number ten on November 1, 1987. The following week the song charted out of the top ten and the next week returned to the top ten at number nine, which was its peak position. The song debuted at number eighty-seven in Dutch on September 9, 1987. The following week, the song moved up to number eleven, which was seventy-three positions higher than its previous week. The song peaked at number one, and remained at the top position for two consecutive weeks. In 2006, Jackson's music re-entered charts following his music being re-issued for his Visionary album. The track entered Spanish charts for the first time on April 4, 2006, and debuted at the top position. "Bad" remained within the top twenty positions for nine consecutive weeks. The song debuted at its peak position at number five in Italy on April 6. After Jackson's death in June 2009, his music re-entered charts again worldwide. In July, the track peaked at number eleven in Italy, number twenty in Spain, number twenty-five in Sweden, number thirty-seven in Denmark and number forty in the United Kingdom.

Critical reception
"Bad" was well received by contemporary music critics. Some critics noted that the song helped Jackson's image become more edgy. Davitt Sigerson, a writer for Rolling Stone magazine, commented that the track" needs no "defense" and he generally praised Jackson's vocal performance in the song. Stephen Thomas Erlewine of AllMusic listed "Bad", along with two other songs from the album, as being top picks from the album's eleven tracks. In separate review of the song, Erlewine commented that Jackson's vocals "sounded like [he was] the love child of James Brown and Mavis Staples" and added that "musically speaking, in this case, 'Bad' is very good". He also noted that the track's "authority and boasting helped to humanize" Jackson and "changed his image", remarking that it was "fun hearing him talking trash and being his own bigger booster". Jennifer Clay of Yahoo Music noted that while Jackson's new edgier image was a "little hard to swallow", the image worked musically on the album's songs "Bad", "Man in the Mirror", and "Dirty Diana".

Music video 

The full music video for "Bad" is an 18-minute short film written by novelist and screenwriter Richard Price, shot by Michael Chapman, and directed by Martin Scorsese. The video was shot in Brooklyn over a 6-week period during November and December 1986. The video has many references to the 1961 film West Side Story, especially the "Cool" sequence. The video used a different version of the song as opposed to the commercially released version. This version, using a different organ solo in the middle, hasn't been commercially released as of yet.

In the video, Jackson portrays a teenager named Darryl, who has just completed a term at an expensive private school. He returns to the city and takes the subway back to his neglected neighborhood. Darryl finds his home is empty where he is greeted by his old friends, led by Mini Max (a then mostly unknown Wesley Snipes). At first, relations are friendly but slightly awkward, but the gang starts to realize how much Darryl has changed and how uncomfortable he has become with their criminal activities. Darryl takes the gang to the subway station (Hoyt–Schermerhorn Streets in Brooklyn) in an attempt to show his friends he is still "bad" by robbing an elderly man. He has a change of heart at the last minute and Max chastises him, telling Darryl he is no longer bad. With Darryl provoked, the video then cuts to him and a group of street youths dancing while he sings the song "Bad". Darryl insists that Max is headed for a fall which is nearly Darryl's undoing. Eventually, Max accepts that Darryl is better off without him and leaves him in peace after a final handshake.

The video was not commercially released until it was included in the video albums; Video Greatest Hits - HIStory (long version on DVD and short version in VHS), Number Ones (short version), Michael Jackson's Vision (long version) and the Target version DVD of Bad 25 (short version). The full video was introduced in a TV special, Michael Jackson: The Magic Returns, on Primetime, a CBS television show on August 31, 1987. The full video won awards at various prestigious award ceremonies including Favorite Single (Soul/R&B) at the American Music Awards and Biggest Selling Album by a Male Soloist in the UK from the Guinness Book of World Records. The video has been praised by critics as one of the most iconic and greatest videos of all time; Jackson's outfit has been cited as an influence on fashion.

After Jackson's death in June 2009, Letitia James, of the New York City Council, began trying to convince the agency to rename or co-name the Hoyt–Schermerhorn Streets station or to hang a plaque at the station in Jackson's honor. However, her request was denied by the Metropolitan Transportation Authority in September 2009. James commented, "Having Michael Jackson visit and moonwalk at this station was a huge deal not only for Brooklyn, but all of New York in the '80s ... And renaming this station in his honor would put it on the map and help ensure that people don't forget." A source from the MTA commented that no subway stations in the MTA system are named or co-named after individuals, mostly because it could confuse riders. The MTA also declined to put a plaque in the station, due to MTA guidelines forbidding such a thing.

Choreography 
The video's choreographers Jackson, Jeffrey Daniel, and Gregg Burge were influenced by West Side Story when designing the dance routines but wanted to keep the scene more contemporary and incorporated the "moonwalk" into the movements. Assistant choreographer Jeffrey Daniel commented, "It's like a train coming across the screen ... and that's the effect I was looking for and it worked". The music video received a nomination for choreography at the 1988 MTV Video Music Awards Ceremony. The video for "Bad" and Michael Jackson's "The Way You Make Me Feel" video were both nominated for Best Choreography. However, Janet Jackson's video "The Pleasure Principle" won the award.

Live performances
"Bad" was performed during Jackson's Bad world tour concert series from 1987 to 1989, in both the first and second leg, as the final song in the first leg and sixteenth song in the second leg in the setlist. The song was also included on the first leg only of Jackson's Dangerous World Tour. A live version of the song at Wembley 1988 and Yokohama 1987 are available on the DVD Live at Wembley July 16, 1988.

Covers and parodies
In 1987, UK actor and comedian Lenny Henry  made a spoof of this song and gave it a title "Mad".

"Weird Al" Yankovic recorded a parody of the song, titled "Fat", for his 1988 album Even Worse. Jackson granted Yankovic permission to film the music video for "Fat" on the actual subway set from the "Bad" music video.

In 1989, John Oswald released an expanded version of his original Plunderphonics album containing Michael Jackson's song "Bad," cut up, layered, and rearranged as "Dab." In 1990, notice was given to Oswald by the Canadian Recording Industry Association on behalf of several of their clients that all undistributed copies of Plunderphonics be destroyed under threat of legal action.

The American TV series Glee did a Michael Jackson tribute episode in 2012 titled "Michael", which included an a cappella version of "Bad" featuring the Beelzebubs as part of The Warblers. This cover debuted and peaked at number 80 at Billboard Hot 100, number 48 at Billboard Digital Songs, number 90 at Billboard Canadian Hot 100, and number 29 at Billboard Adult Pop Songs chart at the week of February 18, 2012.

In February 2018, Billie Eilish covered the song with her brother Finneas O'Connell for Like a Version.

Charts

Weekly charts

Year-end charts

Certifications

Track listings and formats

United Kingdom 7" single
 "Bad" (7" single mix) – 4:06
 "Bad" (dance remix radio edit) – 4:54

United Kingdom 12" single
 "Bad" – 4:06
 "Bad" (dance extended mix includes "false fade") – 8:24
 "Bad" (dub version) – 4:05
 "Bad" (a cappella) – 3:49

United States / Europe 7" single
 "Bad" – 4:06
 "I Can't Help It" – 4:28

United States CD single
 "Bad" (dance extended mix; includes "false fade") – 8:24
 "Bad" (7" single mix) – 4:06
 "Bad" (dance remix radio edit) – 4:54
 "Bad" (dub version) – 4:05
 "Bad" (a cappella) – 3:49

Visionary single
CD side
 "Bad" (7" single mix) – 4:06
 "Bad" ("false fade" dance extended mix) – 8:22

DVD side
 "Bad" (music video (short version)) – 4:20
 "Bad" (music video) – 18:06

Official versions
 Album version – 4:06
 7" single mix (new album version) – 4:06
 Dance extended mix includes "false fade" – 8:23
 Dance remix radio edit – 4:56
 Dub version – 4:06
 A cappella – 3:49
 Afrojack Club Mix – 7:36
 Afrojack remix featuring Pitbull DJ Buddha Edit – 4:31
 "Remember the Time"/"Bad" (Immortal version) – 4:39

Personnel

 Written, composed, vocal arrangement and co-produced by Michael Jackson
 Produced by Quincy Jones
 Michael Jackson: solo and background vocals
 Jimmy Smith: Hammond B3 Midi organ solo
 Greg Phillinganes: synthesizer solo
 John Robinson: drums
 Douglas Getschal: drum programming
 David Williams: guitar

 Kim Hutchcroft, Larry Williams: saxophones
 Gary Grant, Jerry Hey: trumpets
 Paulinho Da Costa: percussion
 Christopher Currell: Synclavier keyboards, digital guitar, rubboard
 John Barnes, Michael Boddicker, Greg Phillinganes: synthesizers
 Rhythm arrangement by Michael Jackson, Christopher Currell and Quincy Jones
 Horn arrangement by Jerry Hey

2012 reissue

A remix of "Bad" featuring Afrojack, DJ Buddha and Pitbull was produced for the 2012 Bad 25 album reissue. It was made available as a digital single prior to the album's release, via iTunes and Amazon.com on August 14, 2012.

Track listing
 Digital Single
 "Bad" (Afrojack Remix) feat. Pitbull [DJ Buddha Edit] - 4:29

 HMV Exclusive CD Single (HMV Bad 25 pre-order only bonus CD)
 "Bad" (Afrojack Remix) feat. Pitbull [The Derry Mix] - 3:54

Chart performance
Re-titled as "Bad 2012", the single appeared on several countries' music charts, including debuting at number 52 on the Billboard Japan Hot 100 chart, in the week of September 15, 2012 and peaking at number 6 several weeks later. It also appeared on the US Billboard Dance/Electronic Digital Songs Chart at number 45 for one week on September 1, 2012. On the week of September 29, 2012, it debuted on the Hot Dance Club Songs chart at number 42, and peaked at number 18.

Critical reception
This remix received overwhelmingly negative reviews from music critics. Randall Roberts of the Los Angeles Times wrote that the remixes on Bad 25 were "terrible... and are an insult to MJ's memory not because they rework his music, but because they do it so ungracefully." Evan Sawdey from PopMatters said "Afrojack has two remixes of "Bad" here, obviously trying to make the song sound like it belongs on modern-day radio (one of them, with two guest verses from Pitbull, is just outright trash)." MisterCharlie from SupaJam.com also gave it an extremely negative review. The Guardian's review said it was "a clubbed-up remix featuring the world's worst rapper."

Chart

Citations

General and cited references

External links
 
 

1987 singles
1987 songs
2012 singles
American pop rock songs
Billboard Hot 100 number-one singles
Cashbox number-one singles
Dutch Top 40 number-one singles
Irish Singles Chart number-one singles
Michael Jackson songs
Music videos directed by Martin Scorsese
Number-one singles in Norway
Number-one singles in Spain
Song recordings produced by Michael Jackson
Song recordings produced by Quincy Jones
Songs written by Michael Jackson
Turner Sports